Silas Hardy (30 April 1867 – 27 June 1905) was an English cricketer.  Hardy was a right-arm fast-medium bowler, although which hand he batted with is unknown.  He was born in Ilkeston, Derbyshire.

Hardy made his first-class debut for Nottinghamshire against Kent in 1893 County Championship.  From 1893 to 1895, he represented the county in 5 first-class matches, the last of which came against Derbyshire in the 1895 County Championship.  In his 5 first-class matches, he scored 45 runs at a batting average of 9.00, with a high score of 12*.  With the ball he took 4 wickets at a bowling average of 68.50, with best figures of 2/100.

He died at Kimberley, Nottinghamshire on 27 June 1905.

References

External links
Silas Hardy at Cricinfo
Silas Hardy at CricketArchive

1867 births
1905 deaths
People from Ilkeston
Cricketers from Derbyshire
People from Kimberley, Nottinghamshire
Cricketers from Nottinghamshire
English cricketers
Nottinghamshire cricketers